Gao Song (born March 20, 1981) is a Chinese former competitive figure skater. He is the 2002 Four Continents bronze medalist, 2003 NHK Trophy bronze medalist, 1999 Junior Grand Prix Final champion, and 2006 Chinese national champion.

Career 
Gao won the silver medal at the 1998 ISU Junior Grand Prix in China.

In the 1999–2000 JGP series, he qualified for the final by winning gold in Norway and placing fourth in Japan. In December 1999, he was awarded the gold medal at the JGP Final in Gdańsk, Poland, ahead of Germany's Stefan Lindemann and Canada's Fedor Andreev. In March 2000, he finished sixth at the 2000 World Junior Championships in Oberstdorf, Germany, having placed fourth in his qualifying group, sixth in the short program, and sixth in the free skate.

Gao failed to qualify for the Chinese national team and received no international assignments in the 2000–01 season. He returned the next season and won the bronze medal at the 2002 Four Continents Championships. He finished 16th at the 2002 World Championships.

During the 2003–04 Grand Prix series, Gao placed fourth at the 2003 Cup of China and won the bronze medal at the 2003 NHK Trophy. He qualified for the Grand Prix Final, where he finished fifth.

Programs

Competitive highlights
GP: Grand Prix; JGP: Junior Grand Prix

References

External links 

 

1981 births
Living people
Chinese male single skaters
Figure skaters at the 2007 Winter Universiade
Figure skaters from Harbin
Four Continents Figure Skating Championships medalists
Competitors at the 2005 Winter Universiade
Competitors at the 2009 Winter Universiade